William St James Wheelhouse (1821 – 8 March 1886) was a British barrister and Conservative Party politician.

The son of James Wheelhouse of Snaith, he was called to the bar at Gray's Inn in May 1844, and practised on the Northern Circuit.

He was elected at the 1868 general election as one of the three Members of Parliament (MPs) for Leeds, and was re-elected in 1874. He was defeated at the 1880 general election by his fellow-Conservative William Jackson, and was unsuccessful when he stood again at the 1885 general election in the new single-seat Western division of Leeds.

References

External links 
 

1821 births
1886 deaths
Conservative Party (UK) MPs for English constituencies
UK MPs 1868–1874
UK MPs 1874–1880
Members of Gray's Inn
Politics of Leeds
People from Snaith and Cowick